The IHI Corporation F7 is a small turbofan engine developed specifically for the Kawasaki P-1 maritime patrol aircraft by IHI Corporation.

Development

IHI started development work on the high bypass ratio turbofan engine in 1998, based on the low bypass ratio engine XF5-1. and the first prototype XF7-1 was tested from 2000 to 2002.  The flight test XF7-10's testing started in 2002.

XF7-10's PFRT (Preliminary Flight Rating Test) started in second quarter 2002, and was completed August 2007 before the XP-1 first flight. PFRT was based on the Military Specification MIL-E-5007D and the original standard about the FADEC system.

Exhaust emission is under the ICAO's standard, NOx is 54%, CO is 33%, UHC is 0.5%, smoke is 74% when standard is 100%.

Strong alloy materials were selected for high corrosion resistance in salt environments, and a sound absorbing panel is mounted.
Noise level is 5~10dB lower than P-3's T56, measurements is 76 dB when idling, 70.6 dB at take off.

P-1's F7-10 is installed thrust reversal with GE's cowl opening systems.

Applications
 Kawasaki P-1

Specifications (F7-10)

See also

References

External links

High-bypass turbofan engines
F7
2000s turbofan engines